Robert Forbes Gentleman (28 August 1923 – 21 October 2005) was a British water polo player who competed in the 1948 Summer Olympics. He was part of the British team which was eliminated in the first round of the 1948 tournament. He played both matches.

References

Robert Gentleman's profile at Sports Reference.com

1923 births
2005 deaths
British male water polo players
Water polo players at the 1948 Summer Olympics
Olympic water polo players of Great Britain